A deer farm (technically a ranch) is fenced piece of a land suitable for grazing that is populated with deer species, such as elk, moose, reindeer, or especially white-tailed deer, raised as livestock.

New Zealand is the largest supplier of farm-raised venison. , New Zealand had approximately 3,500 intensive deer farms, with an estimated stock of 1.7 million deer.

Deer farming
Large-scale commercial farming of deer originated in New Zealand, and that country still has the world's most advanced deer farming industry.

Deer are not native to New Zealand. The first deer were brought to the country from England and Scotland for sport in the mid to late 19th century, and released mainly in the Southern Alps and surrounding foothills. The environment proved ideal, and the uncontrolled introduced populations grew to high numbers. By the middle of the 20th century, these nonnative deer were regarded as pests because of their impact on the native forests. From the 1950s, deer cullers were employed by the government to keep the numbers in check.

The export of venison from wild deer started in the 1960s, turning a pest into an export earner. Industry pioneers saw an opportunity to build on this base, and in the early 1970s started capturing live deer from the wild and farming them. A new industry was born and rapidly spread throughout New Zealand, and later to the United States and Canada.

Fears of chronic wasting disease
Since chronic wasting disease (CWD), a transmissible spongiform encephalopathy similar to mad cow disease, can pass from wild populations of deer to farmed deer, there has been some fear of contamination of the food supply.

Recently, as of 2014, cases of CWD have been found in both farmed and wild cervids in the US and western Canada.

New Zealand is free of CWD. The New Zealand Ministry for Primary Industries undertakes an extensive testing programme which would identify the disease if it occurred in the national deer herd.

See also
Deer hunting

References

External links

 Deer farming reference: Regulations, Deer Farm Directory and information.

—′A beginners reference to starting a deer farm′

World of Deer Museum New Zealand 

Livestock
Deer